A bent in American English is a transverse rigid frame (or similar structures such as three-hinged arches). Historically, bents were a common way of making a timber frame; they are still often used for such, and are also seen in small steel-frame buildings, where the term portal frame is more commonly used. The term is also used for the cross-ways support structures in a trestle. In British English this assembly is called a "cross frame". The term bent is probably an archaic past tense of the verb to bind, referring to the way the timbers of a bent are joined together. Compare this with the term bend for a class of knots.

Bents are the building blocks that define the overall shape and character of a structure. They do not have any sort of pre-defined configuration in the way that a Pratt truss does. Rather, bents are simply cross-sectional templates of structural members, i.e., rafters, joists, posts, pilings, etc., that repeat on parallel planes along the length of the structure.  The term bent is not restricted to any particular material.  Bents may be formed of wooden piles, timber framing, steel framing, or even concrete.

Construction

Traditional timber frame bents were one component of a braced frame in timber framing. Historically, mortise and tenon joints were used  to joint bents to posts and beams due to the unavailability of nails.

Bents are generally pre-assembled, either at the timber framing company's shop or at the construction site. After the basic post and beam structure of the frame has been set in place, the bents are then lifted and simply lowered into place one by one by the crane. Next, the workers bring in additional members, purlins, which tie them together and give the frame a more rigid structure. This process is very safe and efficient, as it allows a crew to assemble a large portion of the frame without ever stepping off the ground. This, in turn, minimizes the amount of time that the crew must spend several stories in the air clambering along beams not much wider than their own feet.

Gallery

See also
 Barn raising
 Pike pole
 Gin pole
 Timber roof truss
 Tau Beta Pi — engineering society whose seal incorporates a bent

Notes

References

External links

Glossary Useful terms in the timber framing trade. 
Blog Entry Some good pictures and a short narrative about raising bents.

Structural engineering
Timber framing
Architectural elements
Bridge components